The 1876 Kentucky Derby was the 2nd running of the Kentucky Derby. The race took place on May 15, 1876. Winning horse Vagrant ran carrying only 97 pounds, one of the lightest loads carried by a winner in Derby history.

Full results

Payout
The winner received a purse of $2,950. The second-place finisher received $200.

References

1876
Kentucky Derby
May 1876 sports events
Derby